The England cricket team toured Australia in 1928–29. England, known as the MCC in matches outside the Tests, retained The Ashes, winning the first four Tests and losing the last for a 4–1 series victory.

Writing in the 1930 Wisden, SJ Southerton wrote:

England were stronger in batting, more reliable and consistent in bowling and very definitely superior in fielding. 

The series was defined by the prodigious runscoring of Wally Hammond, playing his maiden Ashes series, who with a run of scores of 251 at Sydney, 200 and 32 at Melbourne, and 119 not out and 177 at Adelaide, scored a then-record series aggregate of 905 runs at an average of 113.12; the record has only been surpassed once, by Donald Bradman in the 1930 Ashes. In the fifth Test, England's Jack Hobbs became the oldest player to score a Test century, at the age of 46 years and 82 days, a record that still stands.

The MCC team

The MCC touring party was:

Percy Chapman (Kent) (captain)
Jack White (Somerset) (vice-captain)
Douglas Jardine (Surrey)
Jack Hobbs (Surrey)
Herbert Sutcliffe (Yorkshire)
Wally Hammond (Gloucestershire)
Patsy Hendren (Middlesex)
Ernest Tyldesley (Lancashire)
Phil Mead (Hampshire)
Maurice Leyland (Yorkshire)
Maurice Tate (Sussex)
George Geary (Leicestershire)
George Duckworth (Lancashire) (wicketkeeper)
Les Ames (Kent) (wicketkeeper)
Harold Larwood (Nottinghamshire)
"Tich" Freeman (Kent)
Sam Staples (Nottinghamshire)

Tests

First Test

2 December was taken as a rest day.

Second Test

16 December was taken as a rest day.

Third Test

30 December was taken as a rest day.
This Test match still holds the record for the highest match aggregate (1497) without a no-ball extra.

Fourth Test

3 February was taken as a rest day.

Fifth Test

10 March was taken as a rest day.

Ceylon
The English team had a stopover in Colombo en route to Australia and played a one-day single-innings match there against the Ceylon national team, which at that time did not have Test status.

References

Further reading
 Ralph Barker & Irving Rosenwater, England v Australia: A compendium of Test cricket between the countries 1877–1968, Batsford, 1969, .
 Percy Fender, The Turn of the Wheel: MCC Team in Australia 1928–29, London, 1929
 Bill Frindall, The Wisden Book of Test Cricket 1877–1978, Wisden, 1979
 Chris Harte, A History of Australian Cricket, Andre Deutsch, 1993
 Ray Robinson, On Top Down Under, Cassell, 1975
 Wisden Cricketers' Almanack 1930

1928 in Ceylon
1928 in English cricket
1928 in Australian cricket
1929 in English cricket
1929 in Australian cricket
1928-29
1928
Australian cricket seasons from 1918–19 to 1944–45
International cricket competitions from 1918–19 to 1945
Sri Lankan cricket seasons from 1880–81 to 1971–72
1928-29